The Santa Clarita Valley Signal is a newspaper in Santa Clarita, California. It was founded in 1919 as a weekly, the Newhall Signal. From c. 1979 to 2016, the Signal was owned by Savannah, Georgia-based Morris Multimedia, who sold it to Paladin Multi-Media Group. The current owners are Richard and Chris Budman, who purchased Paladin in June 2018.

By 2018, it was the only newspaper serving the city. As at August 2018 it ha a circulation of around 8,000.

History
Morris Multimedia, based in Savannah, Georgia and led by chairman Charles H. Morris, owned the Signal for thirty-seven years. In January 2016, Morris Multimedia sold The Signal to Paladin Multimedia Group. Charles F. Champion, the Signal new president and publisher, said he wanted to "build on the paper's award winning news platform", attract more local advertisements, and increase his audience. At that time the forty editorial, advertising sales, circulation, digital and production departments staff members retained their jobs. Champion's business partners were Gary Sproule, Russ Briley and Ken DePaola.

In June 2018, Richard and his wife Chris Budman purchased the Signal Santa Clarita-based parent company Paladin Multimedia Group in an equity purchase. 

Richard Budman, who had been the Signal publisher under Morris Multimedia from 2004 to 2007, and his wife Chris Budman, purchased the Signal in June 2018. 

Tim Whyte, who had worked with Budman as the Signal general manager until 2007, returned as editor-in-chief in 2018. Whyte writes all the editorials for the daily. In 2018, along with the five-day edition, the Signal began to publish a new Sunday magazine with free distribution to 75,000 households, featuring a "bylined column" entitled "Black and Whyte" by Whyte.

The Santa Clarita Valley Signal covers community news which include government and politics, business, elementary, secondary and college education, public safety, features, entertainment and high school and college sports within the Santa Clarita Valley. It has its own editorial board.

Controversy
According to an October 9, 2018 article in the Columbia Journalism Review (CJR), the new management led to a conservative shift in the paper's editorial stance, which prompted a group of progressives in the Santa Clarita Valley to start their own news outlet, the Proclaimer. According to a July 24, 2018 article in The Daily Beast, the Budmans have espoused conspiracy theories and promoted the Republican Party in the valley. Richard Budman defended himself against allegations that the couple's politics could influence the newspaper's editorial stance, stating that the newspaper ran positive stories on Katie Hill, then a Democratic congressional candidate.

References

External links

Paladin Multimedia Group

Daily newspapers published in California
Santa Clarita, California